Ryan Howe may refer to:
 Ryan Howe (soccer)
 Ryan Howe (wrestler)